The Jacob F. Richardson House, at 205 Park Ave. in Park City, Utah, was built around 1888.  It was listed on the National Register of Historic Places in 1984.

It was a one-story frame "pyramid house" with a pyramidal hipped roof.

The historic house appears no longer to exist; the house currently at 205 Park Ave. appears not to match historic photos.

References

		
National Register of Historic Places in Summit County, Utah
Houses completed in 1888